The Cayson Mound and Village Site (8CA3) is a prehistoric archaeological site located near Blountstown, Florida. It is located three miles southeast of Blountstown, on the Apalachicola River. The site was occupied by peoples of the Fort Walton Culture (a regional variation of the Mississippian culture). On March 15, 1976, it was added to the U.S. National Register of Historic Places.

See also
 Roods Landing site
 Yon Mound and Village Site
 Leon-Jefferson culture
 List of Mississippian sites

References

External links
 Calhoun County listings at National Register of Historic Places
 Archived Calhoun County listings from Florida's Office of Cultural and Historical Programs

Fort Walton culture
Archaeological sites on the National Register of Historic Places in Florida
Geography of Calhoun County, Florida
Mounds in Florida
National Register of Historic Places in Calhoun County, Florida